In seismology, an earthquake swarm is a sequence of seismic events occurring in a local area within a relatively short period. The time span used to define a swarm varies, but may be days, months, or years. Such an energy release is different from the situation when a major earthquake (main shock) is followed by a series of aftershocks: in earthquake swarms, no single earthquake in the sequence is obviously the main shock. In particular, a cluster of aftershocks occurring after a mainshock is not a swarm.

History and generalities 
In the Ore Mountains (Erzgebirge), which form the border between the Czech Republic and Germany, western Bohemia and the Vogtland region, have been known since the 16th century as prone to frequent earthquake swarms, which typically last a few weeks to a few months. Austrian geologist Josef Knett, while studying in 1899 a swarm of about a hundred events felt in western Bohemia/Vogtland in January-February 1824, coined the noun Schwarmbeben, i.e. "swarm [earth]quake". The term "swarm" is explained by hypocentres giving the impression to agglutinate like a bee swarm when plotted onto a map, a cross-section, or still better onto a 3D model.

One of the best documented swarms occurred near Matsushiro, a suburb of Nagano, to the north-west of Tokyo. The Matsushiro swarm lasted from 1965 to 1967 and generated about 1 million earthquakes. This swarm had the peculiarity to be sited just under a seismological observatory installed in 1947 in a decommissioned military tunnel. It began in August 1965 with three earthquakes too weak to be felt, but three months later, a hundred earthquakes could be felt daily. On 17 April 1966, the observatory counted 6,780 earthquakes, with 585 of them having a magnitude great enough to be felt, which means that an earthquake could be felt, on average, every two-and-one-half minutes. The phenomenon was clearly identified as linked to a magma uplift, perhaps initiated by the 1964 Niigata earthquake which happened one year before.

Earthquake swarms are indeed common in volcanic regions (for instance Japan, Central Italy, the Afar depression or Iceland), where they occur before and during eruptions. But they are also observed in zones of Quaternary volcanism or of hydrothermal circulation (for instance Vogtland/western Bohemia or the Vosges massif); or also—though less frequently—far from tectonic plate boundaries (Nevada, Oklahoma or Scotland). In all cases, high-pressure fluid migration in the Earth's crust seems to be the trigger mechanism and the driving process that govern the evolution of the swarm in space and time.
The Hochstaufen earthquake swarm in Bavaria, with 2-km-deep foci, is one of the rare examples where an indisputable relationship between seismic activity and precipitation could be established.

Earthquake swarms raise public-safety issues: first because the end of seismic activity cannot be ascertained; secondly because one can never be sure that another earthquake with a magnitude larger than those of previous shocks in the sequence will not occur. (The 2009 L'Aquila earthquake in Italy is emblematic, with an MW 6.3 shock following a swarm activity with magnitudes between 1 and 3.) Even though swarms usually generate moderate shocks, the persistence of felt earthquakes for a long time can be disruptive and cause distress to the population.

Examples 
The following examples were chosen for peculiarities of certain swarms (for instance: large number of events, complex interaction with larger shocks, long period of time, ultra-shallow focal depth), or because of their geographical region, some swarms occurring in otherwise aseismic regions. It is not intended to be a list of all the swarms happening worldwide.

Asia

India 
 Since 11 November 2018, an earthquake swarm has been observed in the region of Dahanu, Maharashtra, an otherwise aseismic area. Ten to twenty quakes are felt daily, with magnitudes usually smaller than 3.5 (maximum magnitude 4.1 in February 2019). Even with this low-level of magnitude, two shocks proved destructive and even lethal, probably because their foci were very shallow.
 Bamhori village in Seoni district is also experiencing regular earthquakes since February 2000.

Philippines 
 An earthquake swarm occurred from early April 2017 to mid August 2017 in the Philippine province of Batangas. Four shocks in the 5.5–6.3 magnitude range (2017 Batangas earthquakes) caused damage in southern Luzon; they occurred at the beginning of the swarm: Ms5.5 (4 April), Ms5.6 and Ms6.0 (8 April), and Ms6.3 (11 April). The swarm origin of the 3 first major quakes seems established since they had practically the same epicentre; they occurred within the crust (7–28-km depth range). However, the strongest and latest quake does not seem related to the swarm: its epicentre is 50 km away, and its focal depth is moreover very different (177 km, according to Phivolcs, the local seismic monitoring agency, a value which classifies this quake as an "intermediate-depth event"). This example shows how complex can be interaction between a swarm and an independent earthquake, even though this last one is very likely to have been triggered by the swarm activity.
 October 15, 2020, an earthquake swarm occurred on Philippine Island of Panay ranging Magnitude 2.5-4.5. Most of these quakes felt in Iloilo City. The last earthquake swarm also hit Panay island on November 5, 2018 (Including Antique, Iloilo and Guimaras) ranging Magnitude 4.0-4.8. The First earthquake (Magnitude 4.7)  at 7:45 A.M, occurred at San Jose Antique. Just a few minutes after, the second quake (Magnitude 4.0) occurred at Sibunag Guimaras. At 10:54 A.M, The third quake (Magnitude 4.8) Occurred at Guimbal Iloilo, Intensity 4 was felt in Iloilo City 
 A series of earthquakes that hit Mindanao in 2019 were classified as an earthquake swarm.On October 16 2019, a Magnitude 6.3 (Mwp) Struck Tulunan cotabato (Epicenter of earthquake). Intensity VII was felt in Tulunan, M'lang, Makilala and Kidapawan City, Cotabato. Intensity VI was felt in Digos City, Davao del Sur; Sto. Nino, South Cotabato; Tacurong City, Sultan Kudarat. On October 29 2019, a Magnitude 6.6 (Mww) struck Tulunan Cotabato again. At least ten deaths were reported and four hundred individuals were injured. Intensity VII was recorded in Tulunan and Makilala, Cotabato; Kidapawan City; Digos City, Bansalan, Magsaysay, Davao del Sur and Malungon, Sarangani. Intensity VI was recorded in Koronadal City and Davao City. Just 2 days after on October 31 2019, an earthquake struck Tulunan Cotabato again (Magnitude 6.5Mww) The death toll of two quakes was raised into 24 and 563 were injured and 11 are still missing. Eva's Hotel in Kidapawan City collapsed during the quake
 October 14-18 2021 an earthquake swarm occurred on Camarines Sur ranging Magnitude 1.7-4.3 with the depth of 1–40 km. Some of these events were felt on Camarines Norte and Albay. PHIVOLCS recorded at least 27 earthquakes (10 were felt) in Camarines Sur.

Europe

Czech Republic / Germany 
 The western Bohemia/Vogtland region is the border area between the Czech Republic and Germany where earthquake swarms were first studied at the end of the 19th century. Swarm activity is recurrent there, sometimes with large maximum magnitudes, as for instance in 1908 (maximum magnitude 5.0), 1985–1986 (4.6), 2000 (3.2), or 2008 (3.8). This latter swarm occurred near Nový Kostel in October 2008 and lasted only 4 weeks, but up to 25,000 events were detected by WEBNET, the local monitoring network. The swarm is located on a steeply-dipping fault plane where an overall upward migration of activity was observed (first events at the bottom and last events at the top of the activated fault patch).

France

 In Alpes-de-Haute-Provence, the Ubaye Valley is the most active seismic zone in the French Alps. Earthquakes can follow there the classical scheme "mainshock + aftershocks" (for instance the 1959 M5.5 earthquake, which caused heavy damage and two casualties). But seismic energy is principally released by swarms. This is particularly the case in the upper valley, between Barcelonnette and the French-Italian border. At the beginning of the 21st century, La Condamine-Châtelard experienced an exceptional swarm activity in an area where usually only a few low-magnitude events occur every year. A first swarm developed in 2003–2004 when more than 16,000 events were detected by the local monitoring network, but with magnitudes keeping to low values (2.7). On a map, the 2003–2004 swarm is 8-km long. After a period of almost complete inactivity, it was followed by a second swarm (2012–2014), slightly offset by a few kilometres, and with a length of 11 km. This second swarm was initiated by an M4.3 earthquake in February 2012. Another M4.8 earthquake in April 2014 reactivated the swarm in 2014–2015. These two major shocks, which caused damage in the nearby localities, were of course followed by their own short sequence of aftershocks, but such a 4-year activity for moderate magnitude shocks clearly characterizes a swarm. Most foci were located in the 4–11-km depth range, within the crystalline basement. Focal mechanisms involve normal faulting, but also strike-slip faulting.
 In the lower Rhône Valley, the Tricastin has been known from the 18th century as the seat of earthquake swarms which sometimes caused damage, as in 1772–1773 and 1933–1936, and which were characterized by barrage-like detonations—at least so reported by the inhabitants. No seismic activity had been documented in the region since 1936, when a very weak swarm appeared for a few months in 2002–2003 (maximal magnitude 1.7). Had their foci not been sited just under a hamlet in the vicinity of Clansayes, and very close to the surface (200 m deep), these shocks would have gone unnoticed. In such a scenario of "ultra-shallow" seismicity, even earthquakes of very low magnitude (1, or 0, or even negative magnitude) can be felt as explosions or water-hammer noises, more than as vibrations. Most foci were located in an Upper-Cretaceous reef-limestone slab which bursts out periodically in the course of centuries for still unknown reasons for a few months or a few years. A 200-m focal depth is believed to be a worldwide record value for tectonic events.
 In the French Alps, the Maurienne Valley is from time to time prone to earthquake swarms. During the 19th century, a protracted swarm lasted 5 years and a half, from December 1838 to June 1844. Some earthquakes of the sequence caused damage in the region close to Saint-Jean-de-Maurienne, but this long swarm with many felt events made things particularly difficult for the population. More recently, a swarm appeared in October 2015 near Montgellafrey, in the lower part of the valley. Its activity kept low until 17 October 2017, when more than 300 earthquakes occurred within a fortnight, with a maximal magnitude of 3.7 being reached twice in late October 2017. The seismic activity lasted another full year, thus yielding a duration of more than 3 years for the full swarm.

Central America

El Salvador 
 In April 2017, the Salvadoran municipality of Antiguo Cuscatlán, a suburb of San Salvador, experienced a sequence of close to 500 earthquakes within 2 days, with magnitudes in the 1.5–5.1 range. There was one casualty and minor damage due to the strongest quake. Local experts did not identify any anomalous activity at nearby volcanoes.

North America

United States 
 Between February and November 2008, Nevada experienced a swarm of 1,000 low-magnitude quakes generally referred to as the 2008 Reno earthquakes. The peak activity was in April 2008, when 3 quakes with magnitudes larger than 4 occurred within 2 days. The largest one registered a moment magnitude of 4.9 and caused damage in the immediate area around the epicenter.
 The Yellowstone Caldera, a supervolcano in NW Wyoming, has experienced several strong earthquake swarms since the end of the 20th century. In 1985, more than 3,000 earthquakes were observed over a period of several months. More than 70 smaller swarms have been detected since. The United States Geological Survey states these swarms are likely caused by slips on pre-existing faults rather than by movements of magma or hydrothermal fluids. At the turn of the year 2008, more than 500 quakes were detected under the NW end of Yellowstone Lake over a seven-day span, with the largest registering a magnitude of 3.9. Another swarm started in January 2010, after the Haiti earthquake. With 1,620 small events in late January 2010, this swarm is the second-largest ever recorded in the Yellowstone Caldera. Interestingly, most of these swarms have "rapid-fire" characteristics: they seemingly appear out of nowhere and can churn out tens or hundreds of small to moderate quakes within a very short time frame. Such swarms usually occur within the caldera boundary, as was especially the case in 2018.

 The Guy-Greenbrier earthquake swarm occurred in central Arkansas beginning in August 2010. Epicentres show a linear distribution, with a clear overall shift in activity towards the southwest with time, and a magnitude of 4.7 was computed for the largest event. Analysis of the swarm has suggested a link with deep waste disposal drilling. It has led to a moratorium on such drilling.
 On 2 September 2017, an earthquake swarm appeared around Soda Springs, Idaho. Five quakes with magnitudes between 4.6 and 5.3 occurred within 9 days. Keeping the 2009 L'Aquila case in mind, and because Idaho had experienced an M6.9 earthquake in 1983, experts warned residents that a stronger quake could follow (an unlikely but still possible scenario for them).
 From early 2016 to late 2019, a swarm of earthquakes occurred near Cahuilla in Riverside County, California. More than 22,000 individual seismic events were recorded—ranging in magnitude from 0.7 to 4.4 -- the strongest one occurred in August 2018, south of Lake Riverside, just off Cahuilla Road (SR 371). By using computer algorithms and machine learning, researchers were able to infer the following detailed picture of the Cahuilla fault zone responsible for the earthquake swarm. This analysis provides detailed evidence that fault zone valving is a mechanism for seismogenesis in swarms.

Atlantic Ocean 
 In El Hierro, the smallest and farthest south and west of the Canary Islands, hundreds of small earthquakes were recorded from July 2011 until October 2011 during the 2011–12 El Hierro eruption. The accumulated energy released by the swarm increased dramatically on 28 September. The swarm was due to the movement of magma beneath the island, and on 9 October a submarine volcanic eruption was detected.

Indian Ocean 
 An earthquake swarm began east of Mayotte on 10 May 2018. The strongest quake (M5.9), the largest-magnitude event ever recorded in the Comoro zone, struck on 15 May 2018. The swarm includes thousands of quakes, many of them felt by Maorais residents. Temporarily-installed ocean-bottom seismometers showed that the swarm active zone was sited 10 km east of Mayotte, deep into the oceanic lithosphere (in the 20–50-km depth range), a rather surprising result because the swarm was believed to be caused by the deflation of a magma reservoir located 45 km east of Mayotte, at a depth of 28 km. (Accordingly, an oceanographic campaign discovered in May 2019 a new submarine volcano, 800-m high and located 50 km east of Mayotte.) The swarm had been tapering off between August and November 2018 when the 11-November-2018 event occurred. This event had no detectable P nor S waves, but generated surface waves which could be observed worldwide by seismological observatories. Its origin is thought to be east of Mayotte. The swarm has continued to be active all through 2019.

Pacific Ocean 
 In January and February 2013, the Santa Cruz Islands experienced a large earthquake swarm with many magnitude 5 and 6 earthquakes: more than 40 quakes with magnitude 4.5 or larger took place during the previous 7 days, including 7 events with magnitude larger than 6. The swarm degenerated into the M8.0 2013 Solomon Islands earthquake (6 February 2013).

See also

1951 East Rift Valley earthquakes
2009– Oklahoma earthquake swarms
Blanco Fracture Zone
Gutenberg–Richter law
Guy-Greenbrier earthquake swarm
Remotely triggered earthquakes

References

 
Earthquakes
Types of earthquake